Old Maid is a Victorian card game for two or more players probably deriving from an ancient gambling game in which the loser pays for the drinks.

History 
The rules of the game are first recorded in England in 1882 and in America in 1884  by Charles M. Green and referred to in Bazaar, Exchange and Mart in 1883 as a "newly invented game". However, it may well be much older and derived from the French game of Vieux Garçon, whose rules first appear in 1853, or from the German game of Black Peter whose rules are recorded as early as 1821. All these games are probably ancient and derived from simple gambling games in which the aim was to determine a loser who had to pay for the next round of drinks (c.f. drinking game). 

They originally employed a pack of 32 or 52 French cards, the queen of diamonds or jack of spades typically being the odd card and the player who is last in and left holding a single queen or jack becoming the "old maid", "", or "Black Peter" depending on the game.  The term "old maid" predates the game, and is a way to refer to a childless or unmarried woman.

Rules
There are retail card decks specifically designed for playing Old Maid, but the game can just as easily be played with a standard 52-card deck. When using a regular deck, a card is either added or removed, resulting in one unmatchable card. The most common choices are to remove the Queen of Clubs or to add a single Joker. It is also possible to remove one card face-down from the top of the deck before hands are dealt; if this is done, players will not know which card is unmatchable. The unmatchable card becomes the "old maid", and whoever holds it at the end of the game is the loser.

The dealer shuffles and deals all of the cards to the players, one card at a time. Some players may have one more card than others; this is acceptable. Players look at their cards and discard any pairs they have (e.g., two kings) face up. Players can only discard pairs, so a three-of-a-kind is prohibited. In common variants, the suit colors of a discarded pair must match: Spades must match with Clubs and Diamonds must match with Hearts.

Beginning with the dealer, each player takes turns offering their hand face-down to the player on their left. That player selects a card without looking and adds it to their hand. This player then sees if the selected card makes a pair with any of their original cards. If so, the pair is discarded face up as well. The player who just took a card then offers their hand to the person on their left, and so on. 

The game continues with players taking cards and discarding pairs until no more pairs can be made. The player with the card that has no match is "stuck with the old maid" and loses. When playing with more than two players, the game is somewhat unusual in that there is one single loser rather than one distinct winner.

Scabby queen 
Scabby queen is a variation of Old Maid played with a standard pack of cards from which the Queen of Clubs has been removed. The player left with the "scabby queen" (Queen of Spades) is the loser and receives a number of raps on the knuckles with the edge of the pack. The number of raps is decided by reshuffling the pack and getting the loser to draw a card. He or she get the number of raps based on the face value of the card or, if it is a jack or king, 10 raps; if it is a queen, 21 raps. If the loser draws a red card he or she receives soft raps; if a black card, hard raps.

Black Peter 

The equivalent game in many European countries is known (in each country's own language) as "Peter" or "Black Peter", and is played with special cards, typically 31 or 37, in which the odd one out is typically a chimney sweep or a black cat. The game can also be played with a standard 32-card pack from which a black jack is removed. The loser often gets a smudge on his or her face with a piece of soot or piece of burnt cork.

Variants
In some variants, all players discard only after the dealer has had their turn to take a card.
Alternatively, play can proceed in reverse order, with players taking a new card before giving one up. In this variation, players can be stuck in "old maid purgatory", i.e. with one card and no way to get rid of it.
 Jackass, a variant played in Trinidad, removes the jack of diamonds; the jack of hearts is then the odd card. The player left holding it is the "jackass".
It is played exactly as Old Maid, but instead of removing a queen or any other card, a joker is added, and the player who is left with it loses.
 A variant played in the Philippines, is called . The game is played as Old Maid except  card can be removed at the start of the game. That card is revealed at the end of the game and the person left with its "partner" (the odd card) loses and is called  (Tagalog for 'monkey').
 In Brazil, two variants of the game are played: One, called , literally 'stink', is played with a regular deck from which one card has been removed. The other, played with a specialty deck, is called , or 'capuchin-monkey game'.  The cards in this version depict animals, each one having a male and a female card representation; only the capuchin monkey is unpaired.

See also
Donkey
Happy Families
Hearts

References

Literature 
 _ (1882). Cassell's Book of Sports and Pastimes. London, Paris and New York: Cassell, Petter, Galpin.

External links

 Rules of Card Games: Old Maid on Pagat.com

English card games
Card passing games
Card games introduced in the 1880s
Gambling games
Card games for children